Jeff Prough (born April 20, 1986) is an American professional ice hockey player who is currently playing for the Greenville Road Warriors in the ECHL.

Awards and honors

Played in the 2010 ECHL All-Star Game

References

External links

1986 births
Albany Devils players
American men's ice hockey forwards
Brown Bears men's ice hockey players
Florida Everblades players
Greenville Road Warriors players
Gwinnett Gladiators players
Ice hockey players from Michigan
Living people
Lowell Devils players
Sioux Falls Stampede players
Trenton Devils players